This is a list of the main career statistics of American tennis player Helen Wills. During her career, which ran from 1919 through 1938, she won 19 singles tiles at Grand Slam tournaments as well as 9 doubles and 3 mixed doubles titles. She won the Olympic gold medal in singles and doubles in 1924. Wills was unbeaten in 180 singles matches .

Grand Slam tournament finals

Singles: 22 (19 titles, 3 runner-ups)

Doubles: 10 finals (9 titles, 1 runner-up)

Mixed doubles: 7 finals (3 titles, 4 runner-ups)

Olympic finals

Singles: 1 final (1 gold medal)

Doubles: 1 final (1 gold medal)

Career finals

Singles: 67 (57 titles, 10 runner-ups)

Sources:Wright & Ditson's Lawn Tennis GuidesHelen Wills: Tennis, Art, Life

Team competitions

Wightman Cup

Wightman Cup reference

International matches

Double bagel match victories
During her career Wills defeated opponents 50 times without the loss of a game, i.e. via a double bagel (6–0, 6–0).

Source:Helen Wills: Tennis, Art, Life

Performance timelines

Singles

Note 1: Wills withdrew from both the French Championships and Wimbledon Championships in 1926 after having an appendectomy. The French walkover is not counted as a loss. One week prior to Wimbledon, the tournament was informed that she would not play. She was given a default from her opening round match, which Wimbledon does not consider to be a "loss".

Note 2: Prior to 1925, the French Championships was not open to international players.

Doubles

Mixed doubles

Longest winning streaks and records

 180 match win streak from 1927–1933.
 Did not lose a set from 1927–1933.
 Wills was ranked world No. 1 for eight years.

See also
 Suzanne Lenglen career statistics

References

Tennis career statistics